The 1997 Vuelta a Andalucía was the 43rd edition of the Vuelta a Andalucía (Ruta del Sol) cycle race and was held on 16 February to 20 February 1997. The race started in Seville and finished in Granada. The race was won by Erik Zabel.

Teams
Seventeen teams started the race:

 
 
 
 
 
 
 
 Foreldorado–Golff
 
 
 Palmans–Lystex
 
 
 
 Troiamarisco
 
 Ipso–Euroclean

General classification

References

Vuelta a Andalucia
Vuelta a Andalucía by year
1997 in Spanish sport